YARV (Yet another Ruby VM) is a bytecode interpreter that was developed for the Ruby programming language by Koichi Sasada. The goal of the project was to greatly reduce the execution time of Ruby programs.

Since YARV has become the official Ruby interpreter for Ruby 1.9, it is also named KRI (Koichi's Ruby Interpreter), in the same vein as the original Ruby MRI, named in honor of Ruby's creator Yukihiro Matsumoto.

Performance
Benchmarks by rubychan.de showed significant increases in performance. Benchmarks by Antonio Cangiano showed speed improvements over other Ruby VMs, with 1.9 on average four times faster than the original interpreter. All evaluations comprised a mix of mostly synthetic benchmarks.

History
YARV was merged into the Ruby Subversion repository on January 1, 2007. It was released as part of Ruby 1.9.0 on December 26, 2007, replacing Ruby MRI.

See also
 Parrot virtual machine
 Rubinius
 Ruby programming language

References

External links
 YARV home page Note: obsolete now that YARV is merged into Ruby
 YARV: Yet Another RubyVM ... on Rails? - Koichi Sasada's RubyConf 2006 presentation

Ruby (programming language)